The 1946 Soviet Cup was an association football cup competition of the Soviet Union. The whole competition was played in Moscow.

Competition schedule

First round
 [Oct 6]
 CDKA Moskva                  4-1  Zenit Leningrad 
   [Ivan Shcherbakov 6, Valentin Nikolayev 54, Alexei Grinin 84 pen, Vsevolod Bobrov 90 – Ivan Komarov 49] 
 TORPEDO Moskva               3-0  Krylya Sovetov Kuibyshev 
   [Vasiliy Zharkov 23, 48, Vasiliy Panfilov 87] 
 [Oct 7] 
 DINAMO Moskva                4-0  Pishchevik Moskva 
   [Konstantin Beskov 32, Vasiliy Trofimov 43, 68, Alexandr Malyavkin 85] 
 Dinamo Tbilisi               0-0  Dinamo Minsk 
 [Oct 8] 
 SPARTAK Moskva               6-2  VVS Moskva 
   [Alexei Sokolov-2, Ivan Konov, Georgiy Glazkov, Boris Kulagin (V) og, Alexandr Afonkin (V) og – Nikolai Gulyayev (S) og, Viktor Ponomaryov] 
 SPARTAK Uzhgorod             4-3  Dinamo Leningrad         [aet] 
   [Dezideriy Tovt 17, R.Aikhert 62, A.Zdor 67, I.Fabian 93 – Yevgeniy Arkhangelskiy 4, Vasiliy Lotkov 21, Anatoliy Viktorov ?] 
 [Oct 9] 
 DINAMO Kiev                  3-0  Dinamo Riga 
   [Anatoliy Gorokhov 22, Oleg Zhukov 37, Pavel Vinkovatov 52] 
 KRYLYA SOVETOV Moskva        2-1  Traktor Stalingrad 
   [Nikita Simonyan, Ruperto Sagasti – Viktor Matveyev]

First round replays
 [Oct 8] 
 DINAMO Tbilisi               2-0  Dinamo Minsk 
   [Viktor Berezhnoi ?, Avtandil Gogoberidze 90]

Quarterfinals
 [Oct 11] 
 Dinamo Moskva                1-2  DINAMO Tbilisi 
   [Vasiliy Kartsev 75 – Boris Paichadze 14, Viktor Berezhnoi 60] 
 TORPEDO Moskva               4-0  CDKA Moskva              [aet] 
   [Vasiliy Zharkov 91, Alexandr Ponomaryov 109, 116, Pyotr Petrov 118] 
 [Oct 13] 
 Krylya Sovetov Moskva        1-2  DINAMO Kiev              [aet] 
   [Pyotr Dementyev 54 – Oleg Zhukov 75, Viktor Rogozyanskiy 91] 
 SPARTAK Moskva               5-0  Spartak Uzhgorod  
   [Georgiy Glazkov 6, 69, Nikolai Dementyev 11, Alexei Sokolov 79, Nikolai Klimov 86]

Semifinals
 [Oct 15] 
 Torpedo Moskva               1-2  DINAMO Tbilisi 
   [Pyotr Petrov 80 – Viktor Panyukov 6, Viktor Berezhnoi 60] 
 [Oct 16] 
 SPARTAK Moskva               3-1  Dinamo Kiev 
   [Oleg Timakov 25, Boris Smyslov 75, Ivan Konov 88 – Anatoliy Gorokhov 67]

Final

External links
 Complete calendar. helmsoccer.narod.ru
 1946 Soviet Cup. Footballfacts.ru
 1946 Soviet football season. RSSSF

Soviet Cup seasons
Cup
Soviet Cup
Soviet Cup